Kanoria foundation was founded back in 2014, is a trustee organization headquartered in Kolkata, India. Kanoria Foundation actively helps and supports social activities like sponsoring students' education, holding spiritual conferences and supporting the survivors of acid attack.

Acid Survivors and Women Welfare Foundation (ASWWF)
Acid Survivors and Women Welfare Foundation(ASWWF) is an NGO formed and managed by Kanoria foundation for the support and welfare of acid attack survivors.Acid attack survivors are helped financially to get the medications and for their survival. 

They have opened their wings in Odisha and Bihar also so that the acid attack victims women could get the advocacy, financial support and the help for their rehabilitation.

Education Organizations
Kanoria foundation has an initiative of it i.e., Srihari Global School Asansol, the aim of this NGO is to provide complete body, mind and soul enrichment of the child. This uses pedagogical pattern in teaching and has its affiliation with CBSE board.

Around 700 underprivileged students are benefitted in their scholarships, free meals and education from the sarvodaya schools, which are established by Kanoria foundation for the weaker section of the society. These two Sarvodaya schools are affiliated to West Bengal Board of Secondary Education.

Universal Spirituality and Humanity Foundation
This initiative of Kanoria foundation has been conducting The World Confluence of Humanity, Power & Spirituality over the years which involves the eminent speakers around the world to speak on humanity and spirituality.Eminent personalities like Late Dr. A. P. J. Abdul Kalam, Former President of India, Late Pranab Mukherjee, Former President of India, had graced this confluence and also got the compliments from Shri Narendra Modi, Hon'ble Prime Minister of India, Shri Ram Nath Kovind, Hon'ble President of India, Shri Venkiah Naidu, Hon'ble Vice President of India.

References

Foundations based in India
Non-profit organisations based in India
Non-governmental organizations
Philanthropic organizations
Educational organisations based in India